Tibor Fábián (26 July 1946 – 6 June 2006) was a Hungarian football defender, who played for Vasas SC.

He participated in UEFA Euro 1972 for the Hungary national football team. He made 16 appearances for Hungary from 1971 to 1974.

References

1946 births
2006 deaths
Footballers from Budapest
Association football defenders
Hungarian footballers
Hungary international footballers
Vasas SC players
UEFA Euro 1972 players